1:43 may refer to:

1:43 scale, a size of die-cast model cars
1:43 (band), a  band from the Philippines

Date and time disambiguation pages